Geared was an iOS game by American developer Bryan Mitchell. A sequel entitled Geared 2! was released December 16, 2010, but years later they were both discontinued.

Critical reception
MEGamers gave Geared 81/100, writing " A very unique (sic), enjoyable experience when compared to the crowd of other puzzle games available on this platform. Definitely worth your time and money. " GamePro gave it an 80%, commented "Geared won't tickle your brain in quite the same way that Portal could, but it's an excellent iPad game that comes at a great price."

Geared 2! had a metacritic score of 84% based on 5 critic reviews.

References

2009 video games
Android (operating system) games
Puzzle video games
IOS games
Video games developed in the United States
Windows games